The Sonny Kendis Show was an early United States television series which aired on CBS Television from April 18, 1949, to circa January 3, 1950. Unusually, the series aired in a 10-minute time slot, at 7:45pm to 7:55pm ET on Mondays, Tuesdays, Thursdays, and Fridays, preceded by the 15-minute CBS Television News, and followed by the 5-minute Ruthie on the Telephone.  

The show featured pianist and big band leader Sonny Kendis (1911-1974) and vocalist Gigi Durston (born October 8, 1927). On Wednesdays at 7:45pm ET, the 15-minute musical show Earl Wrightson at Home aired on CBS.

Reception
Billboard reviewed the series in its September 3, 1949, issue, giving the series a positive review, saying that "Sonny Kendis has the flashy kind of eye-catching piano playing style which, no doubt, will appeal to many viewers" and that "the production and direction were very good."

See also
1949-50 United States network television schedule

References

1949 American television series debuts
1950 American television series endings
Black-and-white American television shows
English-language television shows
1940s American variety television series
1950s American variety television series
CBS original programming